The Legend is a wooden roller coaster at Holiday World & Splashin' Safari in Santa Claus, Indiana, United States. It was designed and built beginning in 1999 by Custom Coasters International, with the help of designers Dennis McNulty and Larry Bill; it opened on May 6, 2000. The Legend is themed after Washington Irving's short story "The Legend of Sleepy Hollow" and mimics the frightful ride Ichabod Crane took as he was chased through the woods by the Headless Horseman. The Legend has been consistently ranked among the world's top twenty-five wooden roller coasters at the Golden Ticket Awards, which are presented annually by Amusement Today magazine.

History

Development
Following the success of The Raven, park President Will Koch began making plans for a second wooden roller coaster. Koch contacted Custom Coasters International and began to form initial plans for the roller coaster. When the initial plans were completed, rather than starting work on the new project, Koch took a different route. He posted the initial plans online and asked for input from roller coaster enthusiasts from around the world on things such as design, theme, and name. After receiving a multitude of emails, Koch determined that "The Legend of Sleepy Hollow" was by far the most popular theming suggestion. Construction began in April 1999 with the pouring of concrete footers. The final design and name, The Legend, was released on June 15, 1999.

On December 11, 1999, Holiday World invited media outlets to take a construction tour of The Legend. The event required hard hats and included interviews with Will Koch and Denise Larrick.

The Legend opened on May 6, 2000, five years to the day after The Raven. When the roller coaster opened, it operated with a single 24-passenger train made by Gerstlauer. Roller coaster enthusiasts traveled from across the country to ride the roller coaster that had been built with some of their input. Many of these enthusiasts proclaimed The Legend to be their "new #1 wooden coaster".

2002 changes
In October 2001, Holiday World announced that The Legend would be undergoing several changes for the 2002 season. The original Gerstlauer train was replaced with two new ones made by the Philadelphia Toboggan Company. The additional train helped to improve capacity on The Legend from 550 riders per hour to 800 riders per hour.

Several modifications had to be made to the ride to allow for two-train operations. A transfer track was built on the straight section of track between the station and the dip into the lift hill, allowing for an unused train to be stored during normal operation and providing an additional area for maintenance crews to inspect the train. In addition, the station had to be extended to allow for two-train operation, through the addition of an independent brake zone. The track already had a brake zone, but it would have allowed an incoming train to get too close to a train parked in the station to be considered safe. The station was extended so that the train parked in the station would have a buffer roughly the size of a full train. The ride operator's controls, air-powered queue gates, exit gate, and even the pull handle for the bell were moved further down the newly extended station platform towards the transfer track and the lift hill.

2016 changes
During the 2015-2016 off-season, the exit and left turn out of the double helix was modified to incorporate a new double down element, and a new themed tunnel was installed over the section where the track crosses under Frightful Falls.

Characteristics

Station
The Legend's station is themed after a schoolhouse such as the one Ichabod Crane taught at in "The Legend of Sleepy Hollow". The station has only one accessible level, plus an enclosure for a school bell on the roof. Before entering the station, guests first go down a flight of stairs and under the roller coaster's brake run. At the bottom of the stairs, there is a multitude of queue switchbacks, going all the way back to the beginning of the brake run and the final two turns of the ride. After navigating the switchbacks, guests walk up a flight of stairs that is right next to the third-to-last turn of the ride. At the top of the stairs guests enter the station, where more switchbacks must be navigated before continuing on to the loading area of the ride. On loading side of the station, there are twelve air-powered queue gates, one for each row of the train, as well as the pull handle for the bell. On the unloading side of the station there are free shelves and lockers that riders may use to hold their belongings for the duration of the ride. The unloading side is also the location of the ride operator's controls and a single swinging exit gate.

Trains
The Legend uses two purple, 24-passenger trains made by the Philadelphia Toboggan Company. Each train is made up of six cars that hold four riders each. Each car has two rows holding two riders each. Each row has a seat divider that separates the two riders in that row and ensures each rider remains in a position allowing their restraints to work effectively. The Legend's safety restraints include an individual ratcheting lap bar and an individual, two-point lap belt.

Track
The wooden track on The Legend is made out of numerous layers of Southern Yellow Pine, topped with a single layer of steel along the top, sides, and underside of the track where the train's wheels make contact. The supports for the track itself are wooden as well. The track features a chain lift hill and three block sections, which allows a maximum of two trains to operate at a time. The Legend uses fin brakes throughout the ride to allow the train to be stopped in the brake run, the station, and the transfer track.

Ride experience

The total ride experience on The Legend lasts approximately two minutes.

The ride begins with riders in the station facing the Frightful Falls station. After dispatch, signaled by the ringing of the schoolbell attached to the station, the train immediately passes the transfer track, which is to the right of the main track, and dips down while taking a right turn before latching onto the lift hill chain. While ascending the lift hill, the train passes over the drop on Frightful Falls.

Once at the top of the lift hill, the train makes a small dip down and then back up as it makes a right hand turn. The recorded sound of a wolf howling can be heard before the train dives down a sweeping left-hand  drop at almost  into a covered tunnel.

The track then rises to the left and crosses over Watubee before going under ZOOMbabwe and return track. The track then rises uphill in preparation for the spiral drop. At the crest of the hill, the train passes over anti-rollbacks, then into a  spiral drop to the right. During the drop, the train passes under Zinga before crossing over the outbound track on an air-time hill. After heading uphill again, the train enters a  drop through the second underground tunnel. After exiting the tunnel, the train makes a turn to the right, passing by the structure of the lift hill turn, and then turns left before dipping down another drop and rising into the double helix. In the double helix, the train turns to the right, making two complete circles while passing through two above-ground tunnels and several hills and drops. At the conclusion of the double helix the train goes down hill and crosses over the entrance to the helix, then makes a left hand turn through the double down drop, crosses under the lift hill, and enters what is known as the "four corners of death" by many roller coaster enthusiasts. The first corner is a 90° right turn, followed by a drop under the lift hill of Frightful Falls  and the second corner, a banked 90° turn to the left. The train then travels next to the outdoor queue switchbacks before making a 180° turn to the right, forming the last two corners. Once the train exits the last corner, it immediately enters the final brake run. If both trains are operating, the train will wait in the brake run until the second train has left the station. If not, the train will continue directly into the station at which point riders will unload.

Awards

References

External links
 Official website for The Legend at Holiday World & Splashin' Safari
 Official YouTube video of The Legend posted by Holiday World & Splashin' Safari

Holiday World & Splashin' Safari
Roller coasters in Indiana
Roller coasters introduced in 2000